Tranmere Rovers F.C. played the 1928–29 season in the Football League Third Division North. It was their eighth season of league football, and they finished 7th of 22. They reached the Second Round of the FA Cup.

Football League

References 

Tranmere Rovers F.C. seasons